Rosslynlee Hospital was a mental health facility near Roslin, Midlothian in Scotland. The main hospital building is a Grade C listed building.

History
The hospital, which was designed by William Lambie Moffatt, opened as the Midlothian and Peebles Asylum in 1874. Two wings, designed by Sir Robert Rowand Anderson, were completed in 1898. It joined the National Health Service as Rosslynlee Mental Hospital in 1948 and became Rosslynlee Hospital in 1960.

After the introduction of Care in the Community in the early 1980s, the hospital went into a period of decline and closed in 2011. Plans have been brought forward to redevelop the site for residential use.

References

Further reading

Hospital buildings completed in 1874
Hospitals established in 1874
1874 establishments in England
2011 disestablishments in Scotland
Hospitals disestablished in 2011
Former psychiatric hospitals in Scotland
Defunct hospitals in Scotland
Hospitals in Midlothian